The Langham Estate is a property estate in Fitzrovia, London, and is owned by the Mount Eden Land Limited (Guernsey). The company controls 14 acres of real estate in central London.

Background

The Langham Estate originates from an entity first established in 1925 to manage a holding of 40 acres of land purchased from the Howard de Walden Estate in central London.  The properties, acquired for £3m and located in eastern Marylebone, then passed through various owners, including Sir John Ellerman's Audley Trust, before being acquired in 1994 by Guernsey-based Mount Eden Land Ltd for £51m.  Under Sir John Ellerman, the holdings covered almost all Great Portland Street, and much of streets alongside it (including Hallam, Bolsover, Margaret and Great Titchfield Streets). Numerous holdings on Great Portland Street were divested over the years.

The Langham Estate operates in an area noted for its media connections, restaurants, design showrooms and art galleries.  The Langham Estate was described in 2017 as being one of London's 16 Great Estates with its footprint of 13.8 acres of central London property.  Many of the entity's original properties are still held—but now in the form of freehold as their long leases have been sold off.

Samuel Tak Lee of Hong Kong is said to be its owner. Mr Lee reportedly sought control of Shaftesbury PLC's neighbouring 15-acre estate until his interests in it were sold in June 2020.

Recent developments

The Fitzrovia real estate market has been undergoing a renewal. The area has witnessed significant increase in rents and rates along with markedly higher occupant turnovers.  Property values have increased in part due to changes in planning constraints, along with the impact of the Cross Rail and Oxford Street projects, which were projected to increase commercial activity in the area.

The company markets some of its properties under the banners of Noho and/or FitzNovia to describe an area just north of Oxford Street and just west of Regent Street.  The company website states the company holds a "1.3 million sq feet (29 acre) mixed portfolio of office, showroom, retail, restaurant, bar, residential and storage" properties.

A neighbourhood plan is being developed for Langham Estate's Fitzrovia area. This is being done in consultation with stakeholders, the Langham Estate and other local landlords, businesses and residents.  The plan focused on improving the local amenity, affordable housing provision, poor broadband data services and air pollution conditions.

Gallery

References

External links

 The Langham Estate website
 Map of Langham Estate (Mount Eden Land Guernsey Ltd)
 MyNoHo – The Langham Estate Blog
Langham Estate International
 Fitzrovia – Langham Estate area description
 FitzWest Neighbourhood Forum for West Fitzrovia & Fitzrovia Neighbourhood Association
Survey of London South East Marylebone (Fitzrovia) – Langham Estate area history

1925 establishments in England
British companies established in 1925
Real estate companies established in 1925
Property companies of the United Kingdom
Privately owned estates in London
Buildings and structures in the City of Westminster
Fitzrovia